Austvågøya is the northeasternmost and largest of the larger islands in the Lofoten archipelago in Nordland county, Norway.  It is located between the Vestfjorden and the Norwegian Sea.  The island of Vestvågøya lies to the southwest and the large island of Hinnøya to the northeast. In 2017, the island had about 9,000 residents.

Most of the island is part of Vågan Municipality, while the northeastern part belongs to Hadsel Municipality. The main town on the island is Svolvær.  Austvågøya is popular among mountain climbers.  The famous Trollfjord is located in the eastern part of the island.  Austvågøya is connected by the European route E10 highway to the neighboring island of Hinnøya to the east using the Raftsund Bridge and to the island of Gimsøya to the west using the Gimsøystraumen Bridge.

Geography
The islands surrounding Austvågøya include Gimsøya and Vestvågøya to the west, Skrova, Litlmolla, and Stormolla to the south, Hinnøya to the east, and Hadseløya to the north.

Austvågøya is largely a mountain massif, with lowland almost exclusively at the coastal beaches, the brim of lowland around the coast. Svartsundtindan, Trolltindan, and Olsanestind are also in the eastern part, while the famous Vågakallen looms over the village of Henningsvær in the southwestern part.

Name
The Old Norse form of the name was Vágøy. The first element is the name of the old church site at Vågan where Vågan Church is located today.  The last element is øy which means "island".  The word aust (meaning "east") was later added to the name to differentiate it with the neighboring island of Vestvågøya.

Media gallery

See also
 List of islands of Norway by area

References

External links

DNT - Trollfjordhytta - DNT lodge near Trollfjord

Islands of Nordland
Lofoten
Vågan
Hadsel